This is a list of countries by number of islands, with figures given for the numbers of islands within their territories. In some cases, this figure is approximate and may vary slightly between sources depending on which islands are counted. The criteria for inclusion appear to differ considerably between the countries so they are not necessarily directly comparable. Different languages use different words for islands depending on size and or shape and elevation. For example, in English, a smaller island can be referred to as an islet, skerry, cay, or eyot, leading to confusion over classification as an island in some circumstances. This can influence which islands are counted or not. Some islands are fully submerged by the tides at times, and those may also not be counted by some countries while others do. Where counts vary, this article uses the highest reliably sourced figure.

List

See also 
 List of archipelagos by number of islands
 List of countries by largest island
 Lists of islands

References

External links 
 Global Island Network – Island Links Directory

Islands
Countries